Selenipedium dodsonii is a species of flowering plant in the orchid family native to Ecuador, where it grows near rivers in rainforest. It was first described in 2015, and is named after Calaway Dodson. Selenipedium dodsonii is an endangered species, and is listed in Annex II to the Convention on International Trade in Endangered Species of Wild Fauna and Flora (CITES).

References 

Cypripedioideae
Plants described in 2015